Boasso is a surname. Notable people with the surname include:

Marco Tulio Boasso (born 1962), Uruguayan diplomat
Martín Boasso (born 1975), Argentine footballer
Walter Boasso (born 1960), American businessman and politician

See also
Basso (surname)